Astrophysics for People in a Hurry is a 2017 popular science book by Neil deGrasse Tyson, centering around a number of basic questions about the universe. Published on May 2, 2017, by W. W. Norton & Company, the book is a collection of Tyson's essays that appeared in Natural History magazine at various times from 1997 to 2007.

The book debuted at #1 on The New York Times Non-Fiction Best Seller list when it first appeared in May, 2017. It sold 48,416 copies in its first week, making it the second-most-purchased overall in the U.S. for that week (behind the children's fiction novel The Dark Prophecy). A year later, it remained in the top five and had sold in excess of one million copies.

Reception
In Kirkus Reviews, the reviewer praised Tyson's "down-to-earth wit" and stated that the book "shows once again [Tyson's] masterly skills at explaining complex scientific concepts in a lucid, readable fashion." Tyson was nominated for the Grammy Award for Best Spoken Word Album.

References

Books by Neil deGrasse Tyson
Astronomy books
Cosmology books
2017 non-fiction books
Popular physics books
W. W. Norton & Company books